Johan Cullberg (6 January 1934 – 14 June 2022) was a Swedish professor in psychiatry and psychology, researcher, psychoanalyst, and author of a number of internationally recognised textbooks.

Career 
He started his career at the department of gynecology at the Karolinska University Hospital, Karolinska Institute, in Stockholm studying the effects of birth control. He became head of one of the outpatient clinics in the Nacka Project, doing groundbreaking work on psychiatric care outside the hospital in Sweden. He was recognised for advocacy of lower doses of antipsychotic medicine, reduction in compulsory treatment and more humane psychiatric care. He was awarded the Dobloug Prize (Swedish: Doblougska Priset), a literature prize awarded by the Swedish Academy in 2008.

Cullberg was the son of bishop John Cullberg and brother of painters Erland Cullberg and Carin Adler, and of Staffan Cullberg, who has been head of the Swedish National Arts Council.

Bibliography (partial) 
 Crisis and Development (1975) (revised 1992)
 
 Creating Crisis (1992) 
 Dynamic Psychiatry in Theory and Practice (1993) 
 Mänskliga gränsområden - About extase, psykos and gale creation. Johan Cullberg, Karin Johannisson, and Owe Wikström (red). (1996) 
 Psychoses, a humanist and biological perspective (2000) 
 Evolving Psychosis (International Society for the Psychological Treatment of Schizophrenia and Other Psychoses) (2006) Johan Cullberg with Jan Olav Johannessen, and Brian V. Martindale 
 My psychiatric life, Memoires (2007)

References 

1934 births
2022 deaths
Swedish psychiatrists
Swedish psychologists
Swedish psychoanalysts
Swedish medical researchers
Swedish non-fiction writers
Dobloug Prize winners
People from Västerås